Aberdeen North was a constituency of the Scottish Parliament from 1999 to 2011. It elected one Member of the Scottish Parliament (MSP) by the first past the post method of election. Also, it was one of nine constituencies in the North East Scotland electoral region, which elects seven additional members, in addition to nine (now ten) constituency MSPs, to produce a form of proportional representation for the region as a whole.

Electoral region
See also North East Scotland (Scottish Parliament electoral region)#1999–2011

Between 1999 and 2011, the North East Scotland electoral region consisted of Aberdeen Central, Aberdeen North, Aberdeen South, Angus, Banff and Buchan, Dundee East, Dundee West, Gordon, and West Aberdeenshire and Kincardine.

The region covered the Aberdeenshire council area, the Aberdeen City council area, the Dundee City council area, part of the Angus council area, a small part of the Moray council area, and a small part of the Perth and Kinross council area.

Constituency boundaries
The Aberdeen North constituency was created at the same time as the Scottish Parliament, in 1999, with the name and boundaries of an  existing Westminster constituency. In 2005, however, the boundaries of the Westminster (House of Commons) constituency were subject to major alterations.

Boundary review
 See Scottish Parliament constituencies and regions from 2011 

Following their First Periodic review of parliamentary constituencies to the Scottish Parliament, the Boundary Commission for Scotland has created three newly shaped seats for the Aberdeen City council area. These seats, first contested at the 2011 election, are Aberdeen Central, Aberdeen Donside, and Aberdeen South and North Kincardine. Aberdeen North will be succeeded by Aberdeen Donside.

Member of the Scottish Parliament

Election results

References

See also
Scottish Parliament (Constituencies) Act 2004
Aberdeen City Youth Council

Scottish Parliament constituencies and regions 1999–2011
Politics of Aberdeen
1999 establishments in Scotland
Constituencies established in 1999
2011 disestablishments in Scotland
Constituencies disestablished in 2011